Hasora vitta, the plain banded awl, is a butterfly belonging to the family Hesperiidae which is found in India and parts of Southeast Asia.

Description

The butterfly, which has a wingspan of 45 to 55 mm, is dark brown above. It resembles the common banded awl (Hasora chromus), except in the case of having a broad white band on the under hindwing which is outwardly diffused; also, its wings are more prominently glossed.

Other differentiating characteristics are:

Male: The upper forewing has an apical spot, sometimes with another in 3. The upper forewing has no brand.

Female: The apical spot in the case of the female is larger, and there is an additional spot in 2.

Taxonomy
The butterfly has two subspecies:
 Hasora vitta vitta - South Myanmar (Dawnas), Malaya peninsula, Indonesian archipelago and Philippines.
 Hasora vitta indica - South India, Sikkim, Assam, North Myanmar, Thailand and south western China.

Range
The plain banded awl is found in India in the south (Kanara), Sikkim, Assam and eastwards to Myanmar, Thailand, western China, Malaysia, Indonesia and the Philippines.

Status
Not rare as per Evans (1932). Not common as per Wynter-Blyth (1957).

Host-plants
The caterpillars have been recorded on Derris spp., Pongamia spp., Millettia extensa, Endosamara racemosa, Millettia glabra and Spatholobus ferrugineus.

Cited references

References
Print

Online

Brower, Andrew V. Z., (2007). Hasora Moore 1881. Version 21 February 2007 (under construction). Page on genus Hasora in The Tree of Life Web Project http://tolweb.org/.

Hasora
Butterflies of Singapore
Butterflies described in 1870
Butterflies of Asia
Taxa named by Arthur Gardiner Butler